James Marcus Evans (August 17, 1963 – November 19, 2015) was an American professional football player.

Evans was one of 21 children born to Maxine Cade Evans. He graduated from Mattie T. Blount High School and Southern University. He was selected by the Kansas City Chiefs in the 1987 NFL draft and played two games that season. Evans later joined the Tampa Bay Buccaneers before retiring from the NFL.

Later, Evans wrote two books Power of Human Worth and I Have Worth…So Do You.

References

External links
Pro Football Archives

1963 births
2015 deaths
People from Prichard, Alabama
American football running backs
Kansas City Chiefs players
Southern Jaguars football players
Players of American football from Alabama